The 2022 Campeonato Brasileiro Série C was a football competition held in Brazil, equivalent to the third division. It began on 9 April and ended on 8 October 2022.

Twenty teams competed in the tournament, twelve returning from the 2021 season, four promoted from the 2021 Campeonato Brasileiro Série D (ABC, Aparecidense, Atlético Cearense and Campinense) and four relegated from the 2021 Campeonato Brasileiro Série B (Brasil de Pelotas, Confiança, Remo and Vitória).

In the finals, Mirassol won their first title after defeating ABC 2–0 on aggregate.

Mirassol, ABC, Botafogo-SP and Vitória were promoted to the 2023 Campeonato Brasileiro Série B, while Atlético Cearense, Brasil de Pelotas, Campinense and Ferroviário were relegated to the 2023 Campeonato Brasileiro Série D.

Format changes
Starting from this edition, the first stage had only one group where each team played the other teams in a single round-robin tournament instead of two groups played on a home-and-away round-robin basis. The top eight teams advanced to the second stage, while the bottom four were relegated.

Teams

Number of teams by state

Stadiums and locations

Personnel and kits

Managerial changes

Notes

Format
In the first stage, each team played on a single round-robin tournament against the other clubs. The top eight teams advanced to the second stage. In the second stage, the teams were divided into two groups of four teams each. Each group was played on a home-and-away round-robin basis. The top two teams of each group were promoted to the Série B, while the group winners advanced to the finals.

First stage
In the first stage, each team played the other nineteen teams in a single round-robin tournament. The teams were ranked according to points (3 points for a win, 1 point for a draw, and 0 points for a loss). If tied on points, the following criteria would be used to determine the ranking: 1. Wins; 2. Goal difference; 3. Goals scored; 4. Fewest red cards; 5. Fewest yellow cards; 6. Draw in the headquarters of the Brazilian Football Confederation (Regulations Article 16).

The top eight teams advanced to the second stage, while the bottom four were relegated to Série D.

Group A

Results

Second stage
In the second stage, each group was played on a home-and-away round-robin basis. The teams were ranked according to points (3 points for a win, 1 point for a draw, and 0 points for a loss). If tied on points, the following criteria would be used to determine the ranking: 1. Wins; 2. Goal difference; 3. Goals scored; 4. Head-to-head (if the tie was only between two teams); 5. Fewest red cards; 6. Fewest yellow cards; 7. Draw in the headquarters of the Brazilian Football Confederation (Regulations Article 20).

The top two teams of each group were promoted to the Série B. Group winners advanced to the finals.

Group B

Results

Group C

Results

Finals
The finals were played on a home-and-away two-legged basis, with the higher-seeded team hosting the second leg. If tied on aggregate, the away goals rule would not be used, extra time would not be played, and the penalty shoot-out would be used to determine the champions (Regulations Article 21).

The finalists were seeded according to their performance in the tournament. The teams were ranked according to overall points. If tied on overall points, the following criteria would be used to determine the ranking: 1. Overall wins; 2. Overall goal difference; 3. Draw in the headquarters of the Brazilian Football Confederation (Regulations Article 22).

The matches were played on 1 and 8 October 2022.

|}

Matches

Top goalscorers

References

Campeonato Brasileiro Série C seasons
3
2022 in Brazilian football